Thomas Jefferson Simmons (June 25, 1837 – September 12, 1905) was a justice of the Supreme Court of Georgia from 1887 to 1894, and chief justice from 1894 to 1905.

Early life, education, and military service
Born in Crawford County, near Knoxville, Georgia, where he was raised on a farm, he began his formal education of his own accord at age 18. He read law and opened an office in Knoxville, which quickly became a large and lucrative practice. At the outset of the American Civil War, he enlisted in the Confederate States Army in Crawford's Grays, the first company to leave the county in 1861. His company with assigned to the Sixth Georgia regiment, commanded by Alfred H. Colquitt. Entering service as a private, he was soon promoted to Lieutenant. On the organization of the 45th regiment in March 1862, he was elected Lieutenant Colonel, under colonel Thomas Hardeman. When Hardeman resigned, Simmons was made Colonel. He fought in the Battle of Big Bethel below Yorktown, and in every campaign of the Confederate Army of the Potomac.

Political career
After the war, he served in the Georgia Constitutional Convention of 1865, and later that year was elected to the Georgia State Senate for the 23rd District of Georgia. He served in the state senate for six years, including four years as chairman of the joint finance committee. He served again in the state's Constitutional Convention of 1877. He was twice elected by the legislature to serve as Circuit Judge of the Macon Circuit.

In September 1887, Simmons was elected associate Justice of the Supreme Court of Georgia. In October 1894, he became Chief Justice, which office he held until his death.

References

U.S. state supreme court judges admitted to the practice of law by reading law
Justices of the Supreme Court of Georgia (U.S. state)
1837 births
1905 deaths
Confederate States Army officers
Georgia (U.S. state) state senators
People from Crawford County, Georgia
19th-century American politicians
19th-century American judges